The Korean Communications Zone, abbreviated to KComZ or KCOMZ, was a United States military formation created during the Korean War with overall responsibility for the communications zone including communications, supply, and administration behind the front line, including relations with the South Korean government and the care of civilian refugees and prisoners of war.

KComZ was formed in June 1952 as an amalgamation of 2nd and 3rd Logistical Commands, both of which had previously shared responsibility for supply operations in Korea. It became operational on 21 August 1952 and was responsible for military logistical support to UN and South Korean forces, as well as political and economic relations with the South Korean government, the operation of Korean National Railways, and the control of North Korean and Chinese prisoners of war. Following the end of hostilities in Korea in 1953, KComZ became the Eighth US Army Support Command in July 1956 and was later re-designated US Army Area Command and finally the 7th Logistical Command.

The most common unit insignia worn by KComZ personnel depicted an orange flame in a white bracket at the centre of a green shield. A less common variant, also shaped like a shield, depicted the letters KCOMZ diagonally in white on a green background.

References

External links
 Text of the ROK Presidential Unit Citation to KComZ, March 1954

United States Army units and formations in the Korean War
Sustainment and support units and formations of the United States Army
Military units and formations established in 1952
Military units and formations disestablished in 1956